Salvatore Joseph "Sam" Battaglia (November 5, 1908 – September 7, 1973) was an American mobster and high-level member of the Chicago Outfit criminal organization.

Early career
Battaglia was born in Chicago, Illinois. At age 16, Battaglia joined bosses Johnny Torrio and Al Capone in the Chicago Outfit at the start of the gang war against the mostly Irish North Side Gang, which was under boss Dean O'Banion. By the late 1930s, Battaglia had become a high-ranking member of the Outfit and a formidable loan shark. Debtors behind in their payments would be brought to Battaglia in the back room of the Casa Madrid restaurant, in Chicago, where they would be severely beaten or killed. Supposedly Battaglia's nickname "Teets" came from one such encounter. Another mobster was questioning Battaglia's handling of a debtor and Battaglia yelled back at him, "Shaddup, or I'll bust ya in da teets!"

Outfit member
By 1950, Battaglia had an extensive criminal record that included over 12 counts of burglary, robbery, and murder (he was a suspect in seven homicides). A close associate of Outfit boss Giancana, Battaglia was considered as Giancana's successor once he stepped down. While testifying before the Permanent Subcommittee on Investigations of the U.S. Senate Committee on Government Operations investigations on organized crime, Battaglia pleaded the Fifth Amendment to the United States Constitution over 60 times.

As long-time Outfit leader Antonino ("Tony," "Joe Batters") Accardo stepped away from the limelight to shield himself in the 1950s, Battaglia struggled for power along with rivals Giancana, Felix Alderisio and Fiore "Fifi" Buccieri. 1965 Battaglia became outfit boss, succeeding Giancana, who had fled the country. However, in 1967, Battaglia was convicted of violating the Hobbs Act for obstructing interstate commerce and sentenced to 15 years in prison. With Battaglia in prison and Giancana living in exile in Mexico, Felix "Milwaukee Phil" Alderisio took over as day-to-day boss.

References

Further reading
Binder, John J. The Chicago Outfit. Chicago: Arcadia Publishing, 2003. 
Giancana, Sam and Chuck. Double Cross: The Explosive, Inside Story of the Mobster Who Controlled America. New York: Warner Books, 1992. 
Ovid, Demaris. Captive City: Chicago in Chains. New York: Lyle Stuart, 1969.

Bibliography
Kelly, Robert J. Encyclopedia of Organized Crime in the United States. Westport, Connecticut: Greenwood Press, 2000. 
Sifakis, Carl. The Mafia Encyclopedia. New York: Da Capo Press, 2005. 
Sifakis, Carl. The Encyclopedia of American Crime (2nd. ed) New York: Facts on File Inc., 2005.

External links
Battaglia Brothers by John William Tuohy
Chicago Sun-Times: A century of Chicago mob bosses

1908 births
1973 deaths
American gangsters of Italian descent
Chicago Outfit mobsters
Al Capone associates
Chicago Outfit bosses
People of Venetian descent